Andrey Batt (born August 6, 1985) is a Russian actor, rapper, songwriter, record producer and film producer. After appearances in several American TV shows, Andrey gained popularity not only in United States and homeland Russia, but also in Brazil and whole Europe. Andrey began performing in 2009, appearing in commercials and TV-shows, and now he has enjoyed success in television, film and music. In 2016 he became the first ever musician, who performed with a halftime show at the most prestigious sports tournament in Europe – EuroLeague.

Early life
Batt was born Andrey Sergeevich Batychko on August 6, 1985, in Tallinn, Soviet Union.
At the age of three, Andrey's family moved to Moscow, Russia. Even before he started the first grade, Andrey was engaged in painting.
In 1992, Andrey attended a High School in Moscow that specialized in English Arts. At the age of nine, he already began acting in local school performances.
His current stage name "Batt" has stuck with him since he was young. It means "Bat" on Creole dialect.

At the age of eleven, Batt started playing basketball for the English High School's team.

While attending school, Andrey became involved in filmmaking and film-production. After graduating from school in 2003, he directed several independent projects, documental films and music videos. He also took on musical composition and song writing for several American, Russian, African, and Portuguese artists.

Acting career
 
Andrey began performing in 2009, appearing in several commercials and television roles. His first acting appearance was in NTV Plus channel sports commercial. Later, he starred in several TV shows like Wedding Ring on Channel One and The Capital of Sin (Success by All Means), where his co-stars was famous Russian actors Dmity Nagiev and Viktoriya Tolstoganova.

In 2010 Batt moved to Los Angeles, where he studied acting, filmmaking and film production. Year later, he appeared in several American TV shows like Justified in which he starred opposite of Timothy Olyphant and The Walking Dead. After this Andrey gained worldwide reputation among television viewers.

In 2011 Andrey was one of the main contender for a role of a Russian baseball player Ivan Dochenko in a popular American comedy TV show Eastbound & Down on HBO. However, the role went to American actor Ike Barinholtz.

While appearing on television, Andrey also started segueing into film roles. He filmed in the Japanese independent film Fighting Spirit, but the movie has not been released yet.

Andrey Batt also appeared in a major Russian comedy show Comedy Club on TNT (Russian Television Network). Batt took part in a show's unit called "Foreplay" in which he starred opposite of comedian stand-up actor Serge "Goreliy" Gorelikov.

In summer 2014 Andrey announced his first Russian superhero film called Hero.

Music career

 
Single "Love Above the Clouds" was the first musical experience by Andrey Batychko as his hip-hop alter-ego Batt (Means "Bat" on Creole dialect). It was released on January 15, 2013, on iTunes.

The official video for "Love Above the Clouds" was uploaded to YouTube on January 25, 2013. The music video was filmed in Moscow and directed by Igor Ivanov of China Production Studio.

"Love Above the Clouds" music video is features Russian celebrities and sportsmens as: 
 Actress Darya Melnikova, known for her lead role in a Russian TV series "Daddy's Daughters" on CTC Channel; 
 2012 Olympic Games bronze medalist Anton Ponkrashov of the CSKA Moscow and the Russian national basketball team;
 2009 Universiade silver medalist Anatoly Kashirov of the "Spartak" Saint Petersburg and the Russian national basketball team;
 Three years old Sami, son of the famous Russian hip-hop star Alex Dolmatov, better known as Guf.

On December 16, 2013, Batt releasing his second single "Letniy" featuring vocals from Darya Melnikova. 
It was written and produced by Batt. A music video for the song was released on August 27, 2014.  
The video received positive reception from critics.

Philanthropy
Andrey Batt is a founder of the Charity Box Foundation, a philanthropic organisation that strives to support kids with disabilities.

The charity programmes and events are held regular.

Filmography

Film

Discography

Singles
 2013 – "Lyubov Nad Oblakami"
 2014 – "Letniy" (featuring Dasha Melnikova)
 2015 – "Letniy" (RIA Project Saxophone Dance Remix)
 2017 – "Moy Gorod"

Music Video

 2014 – "Letniy" (featuring Dasha Melnikova)

References

External links 

 
 
 Andrey Batt on "КиноПоиск" 

1985 births
Living people
Russian male television actors
Russian male film actors
Male actors from Moscow
People from Tallinn
Musicians from Tallinn
Russian hip hop
Russian hip hop musicians